Aechmea apocalyptica is a plant species in the genus Aechmea.

Distribution
The Bromeliad is endemic to the Atlantic Forest ecoregion of southeastern Brazil, within Paraná (state), Santa Catarina (state), and São Paulo (state).

It is an IUCN Red List Critically endangered species.

Ornamental plant
Aechmea apocalyptica is cultivated as an ornamental plant.

Cultivars
Named cultivars include:
 Aechmea 'Apocalypse Now'
 Aechmea 'Helen Dexter'

References

apocalyptica
Endemic flora of Brazil
Flora of the Atlantic Forest
Flora of Paraná (state)
Flora of Santa Catarina (state)
Flora of São Paulo (state)
Plants described in 1962
Critically endangered flora of South America
Garden plants of South America